Gene Smith may refer to:

Gene Smith (American football executive) (born 1963), former general manager for the Jacksonville Jaguars
Gene Smith (American football coach) (died 1987), former college football coach
Gene Smith (American football guard) (1905–1979), American football guard 
Gene Smith (athletic director), athletic director at The Ohio State University
Gene Smith (infielder) (born 1911), Negro league baseball player
Gene Smith (pitcher) (1916–2011), Negro league baseball player
Gene A. Smith, American historian
E. Gene Smith (1936–2010), scholar of Tibetology
W. Eugene Smith (1918–1978), American photojournalist
Ray Gene Smith (1928–2005), American football player

See also
Eugene Smith (disambiguation)